Florian Grengbo (born 23 August 2000) is a French track cyclist.

A sprinter, in 2016 he was the French junior team sprint champion, a title he retained in 2017 as well as gaining two bronze medals in the individual sprint and in the keirin at the national championships.

At the 2018 UCI Junior Track Cycling World Championships, he won the team sprint for France alongside Vincent Yon and Titouan Renvoise. At the 2018 European Junior Championships, he was again part of a victorious French team; this time with Rayan Helal and Melvin Landerneau. He also won the keirin, and finished second in the sprint.

In June 2021, he was named to the team sprint event at the 2020 Summer Olympics alongside Helal and Sébastien Vigier.

Major results

2016
 1st  Team sprint, National Junior Track Championships (with Rayan Helal & Lucas Ronat)
2017
 National Junior Track Championships
1st  Team sprint (with Rayan Helal & Nicolas Verne)
3rd Individual sprint
3rd Keirin
2018
 1st  Team sprint, UCI Junior World Championships
 UEC European Junior Championships
1st  Keirin
2nd  Sprint
2020
 UCI World Cup
1st Team sprint, Milton

References

External links

2000 births
Living people
French male cyclists
French track cyclists
Cyclists at the 2020 Summer Olympics
Olympic cyclists of France
Olympic bronze medalists for France
Olympic medalists in cycling
Medalists at the 2020 Summer Olympics
Sportspeople from Bourg-en-Bresse
Cyclists from Auvergne-Rhône-Alpes